A black horse is an equine coat color.

Black Horse and Blackhorse may refer to:

Blackhorse, Dublin, a neighbourhood in Dublin, Ireland
Black Horse, New Jersey, a community in the United States
Black Horse, Pennsylvania, an unincorporated community
Black Horse (spaceplane), a proposed winged, single stage to orbit launch vehicle
Black Horse Cavalry, a 19th-century group of corruptionists in the New York state legislature
Black Horse Pike, an historic route in New Jersey
Black Horse Regiment, nom de guerre of the U.S. Army 11th Armored Cavalry Regiment
Black Horse Pike Regional School District
Black Horse (company), a subsidiary, trading name and the logo of Lloyds Banking Group
Black Horse (Comanche), a Native American Comanche leader
 one of the Four Horsemen of the Apocalypse
 Black Horse Westerns, an imprint of British publisher Robert Hale Ltd.
Blackhorse Road station, on the London Underground and Overground
Black Horse, Preston, a pub in Lancashire, England
 Black Horse, Biggin Hill, a pub in London, England
 Black Horse, Deptford, a pub in London, England
 Black Horse, Hounslow, a pub in London, England
 Black Horse, Kingston upon Thames, a pub in London, England
 Black Horse, Whitechapel, a pub in London, England
Black Horse (legend), a traditional story from French Canada

See also
Black Horse Tavern (disambiguation)
Dark horse